Jack Ascherl (born February 12, 1937) is an American former politician in the state of Florida.

Ascherl was born in Daytona Beach. An alumnus of Florida State University, he is a Chartered Life Underwriter (CLU) and Chartered Financial Consultant (ChFC). He served in the Florida House of Representatives from 1986 to 1996 for district 28. He was speaker pro tempore of the House from 1995 to 1996. He is a member of the Democratic Party.

References

|-

Living people
1937 births
Democratic Party members of the Florida House of Representatives